Spokane was a chestnut thoroughbred stallion foaled in 1886. Winner of the 1889 Kentucky Derby, he was owned and bred by Noah Armstrong. of Montana. Spokane was sired by the Leamington son Hyder Ali and out of the mare Interpose by Intruder.

Spokane is the only horse foaled and trained in Montana to ever win the Kentucky Derby. He did it in 1889, the same year Montana was admitted to the Union. Ridden by Tennessee native Tom Kiley and sent off at 16.4:1 odds, Spokane defeated the heavily favored colt, Proctor Knott and set a new Kentucky Derby record for 1½ miles at 2:34.50. Spokane also won two other important races, the American Derby and the Clark Handicap. He finished second in the Sheridan Stakes and the Peabody Hotel Handicap, and had a third-place finish in the Pelham Bay Handicap.

The barn in which Spokane was born, the Doncaster Round Barn, located about two miles north of Twin Bridges, Montana, has been placed on the National Register of Historic Places.

Pedigree

References

 Nardinger. "Spirit Horse of the Rockies" (1988) Falcon Press Pub. Co. (dist) 

1886 racehorse births
Racehorses bred in Montana
Racehorses trained in the United States
Kentucky Derby winners
Thoroughbred family 9-a